The Epstein–Barr virus nuclear-antigen internal ribosome entry site (EBNA IRES) is an internal ribosome entry site (IRES) that is found in an exon in the 5' untranslated region of the Epstein–Barr virus nuclear antigen 1 (EBNA1) gene. The EBNA IRES allows EBNA1 translation to occur under situations where initiation from the 5' cap structure and ribosome scanning is reduced. It is thought that the EBNA IRES is necessary for the regulation of latent-gene expression.

The EBNA IRES is located in the U leader exon, which is a portion of the mRNA of the Epstein–Barr virus common to all four EBNA1 transcripts.

See also 
 Epstein–Barr virus stable intronic-sequence RNAs

References

External links 
 
 
 
 

Molecular genetics
Non-coding RNA
Epstein–Barr virus
Cis-regulatory RNA elements